The Gaoligong Mountains are a mountainous sub-range of the southern Hengduan Mountain Range, located in the western Yunnan highlands and straddling the border of southwestern China and northern Myanmar (Burma).

Geography

It is the drainage divide between the Nujiang (Salween River) and the Irrawaddy River.

The mountains contain part of the Nujiang Lancang Gorge alpine conifer and mixed forests ecoregion.

Gaoligong Mountain National Nature Reserve

The Gaoligong Mountain National Nature Reserve is made up of three distinct areas.

Another large part of the reserve is the Dulongjian area, west of Gongshan, and home to the Derung people.

Conservation history
In 1983, the Gaoligong Mountain National Nature Reserve was established, and in 1992, the World Wildlife Fund, designated it a level A grade protected area. In 2000, UNESCO accepted it as a Biosphere Reserve member.

The reserve is part of the Three Parallel Rivers of Yunnan Protected Areas, established in 2003, and as such a UNESCO World Heritage Site.

See also

Gaoligongshania megalothyrsa
Gaoligong pika
Gaoligong forest hedgehog
List of UNESCO Biosphere Reserves in China

References

Physical Geography of the Gaoligong Shan Area of Southwest China, in Relation to Biodiversity
UNESCO - MAB Biosphere Reserves Directory
Gaoligongshan Official Website
The Nature Conservancy - Northern Gaoligong Mountain Range
World Database on Protected Areas

Mountains of Myanmar
China–Myanmar border
Mountain ranges of Yunnan
World Heritage Sites in China
Biosphere reserves of China
Tourist attractions in Yunnan
Geography of Nujiang Lisu Autonomous Prefecture
Geography of Baoshan, Yunnan